There are several lists of lunar eclipses

On the Moon, by the Earth
 Type
 List of central lunar eclipses
 Total penumbral lunar eclipse

 Classification
 List of saros series for lunar eclipses
 Tetrad (astronomy) contains lists of tetrads in the late-20th and 21st centuries

 By era
 Lunar eclipses by century
 Historically significant lunar eclipses

On Earth, by the Moon